Mark Hedley Davies (30 June 1960 – 9 January 2011) was an Australian Paralympic athlete. He was born in Darwin, and was the first man to represent the Northern Territory in sport for the blind. He had a degenerative eye condition that caused tunnel vision; he found it more difficult to compete in able-bodied sports as he got older, and by 2000, he had lost all of his sight.

He began his athletic career before the establishment of the Northern Territory Institute of Sport, so he had to organise all his training and transport independently. In 1982 he joined the newly formed Northern Territory Blind Sports Association, and went on to win many medals and break Australian records at national blind sporting championships. At the 1984 New York/Stoke Mandeville Paralympics, he won gold medals in the Men's Pentathlon B2, where he broke a world record, and the Men's 100 m B2. He also competed in athletics without winning any medals at the 1988 Seoul, 1992 Barcelona, 1996 Atlanta, and 2000 Sydney Games. He worked as an athletics coach, and assisted other blind sportspeople in the Northern Territory. In 2000, he received an Australian Sports Medal.

He died in Darwin on 9 January 2011, a week after the death of his wife. The Australian Paralympic Committee described him as "a genuine pioneer of the Australian Paralympic movement".

References

External links
Facebook memorial
Mark Davies – Athletics Australia Results

1960 births
2011 deaths
Paralympic athletes of Australia
Athletes (track and field) at the 1984 Summer Paralympics
Athletes (track and field) at the 1988 Summer Paralympics
Athletes (track and field) at the 1992 Summer Paralympics
Athletes (track and field) at the 1996 Summer Paralympics
Athletes (track and field) at the 2000 Summer Paralympics
Medalists at the 1984 Summer Paralympics
Paralympic athletes with a vision impairment
Paralympic gold medalists for Australia
Paralympic medalists in athletics (track and field)
Recipients of the Australian Sports Medal
Sportsmen from the Northern Territory
Sportspeople from Darwin, Northern Territory
Australian blind people
Australian pentathletes
Australian male discus throwers
Australian male sprinters
Visually impaired discus throwers
Visually impaired sprinters
Paralympic discus throwers
Paralympic sprinters